= Clinician's Brief =

Veterinary clinical publication for small animal practitioners

- Discipline: Veterinary medicine
- Language: English

Publication details
- Former name: NVAC Clinician's Brief
- History: 2002–present
- Publisher: Brief Media (under VetMedux) (United States)
- Frequency: Monthly
- Open access: Yes

Standard abbreviations
- ISO 4: Clin.'s Brief

Indexing
- Clinician's Brief
- OCLC no.: 941036017
- NVAC Clinician's Brief
- ISSN: 1542-4014
- OCLC no.: 50932140

Links
- Journal homepage

Clinician's Brief, formerly NAVC Clinician's Brief, is a free, peer-reviewed clinical publication for veterinarians, providing concise, practical guidance for small animal practitioners through print, digital, and multimedia formats.

== History ==
Clinician's Brief was co-founded in 2001 by Elizabeth Green, John O’Brien, and Antoinette Passaretti under Brief Media. The first issue was published in November 2002 to address the need for brief, digestible clinical content for busy veterinarians.

In 2014, Brief Media introduced a companion publication, Plumb’s Therapeutics Brief, focused on veterinary drug content.

In April 2023, Clinician's Brief underwent a major relaunch with expanded topic categories, interactive tools, multimedia content, and updated clinical dashboards to address modern practice challenges.

== Ownership ==
The publication was originally produced by Brief Media, which operated under Educational Concepts, LLC. In January 2024, Instinct Science, a veterinary software company, acquired VetMedux—the parent company of Brief Media.

== Content ==
Clinician's Brief publishes both print and digital issues, as well as newsletters, podcasts, clinical quizzes, continuing education (CE) modules, and case studies. All content undergoes double-blinded peer review by a team of veterinary experts.

Major content categories include:

- Drugs & Therapeutics
- Clinical Skills
- Practice Life
- Client Communication
- Veterinary Team Education

Interactive content includes quizzes, dashboards for performance tracking, and a daily word game called VetWords.
